Kothari may refer to:

Surname

 Ashish Kothari, Indian environmentalist
 Brij Kothari (born 1964), Indian social entrepreneur
 Daulat Singh Kothari (1905–1993), Indian scientist.
 D. P. Kothari (born 1944), Indian educationist and professor  
 Neelam Kothari (born 1968), Indian actress and jewellery designer
 Jehangir Kothari  (1857-1934), Parsi merchant
 Komal Kothari (1929 – 2004), Indian folklorist and ethnomusicologist from Jodhpur
 Meghna Kothari, Indian film actress 
 Priyanka Kothari also known as Nisha Kothari (born 1983), Indian film actress
 Rajni Kothari (died in 2015), Indian political scientist, political theorist and academic
 S. P. Kothari, Indian academic
 Shuchi Kothari, New Zealand-based Indian scriptwriter, and producer
 Sunil Kothari, Indian dance historian, scholar and critic

Other uses
 Kothari (temple), in the Swaminarayan Hindu Faith
 Kothari Commission
 Kothari River, Rajasthan

Indian surnames